The Painted Trail may refer to: 

 The Painted Trail (1928 film), an American silent western film
 The Painted Trail (1938 film), an American western film